Sunnyvale or Sunny Vale is a locality and former town in the Australian state of South Australia situated about 10 km south west of Kainton in the upper Yorke Peninsula, consisting mostly of a schoolhouse and Methodist church.
Farms nearby were owned by the Lamshed families.

See also 
List of cities and towns in South Australia

References 

Towns in South Australia
Yorke Peninsula